Abbas Maroufi (17 May 1957 – 1 September 2022) was an Iranian novelist and journalist. His most famous novel is Symphony of the Dead.

Born, raised and educated in Tehran, Abbas Maroufi studied dramatic arts at Tehran University while teaching at schools and writing for the newspapers. He served as the editor in chief of the literary Gardun magazine from 1990 to 1995. His first published work was a collection of short stories entitled Into the Sun. He also wrote a few plays which were performed on stage. In his The Last Superior Generation, he touched on social themes. His last collection of short stories, The Scent of the Jasmine was published in the United States.

Maroufi came to prominence with the publication of Symphony of the Dead (1989) which is narrated in the form of a symphony. In this novel, Maroufi uses the stream of consciousness technique very effectively. The Year of Turmoil and The Body of Farhad are among his other works.

Some of his works have been translated into German. Abbas Maroufi's other novels include : "Fereydoon had three sons", "Completely Special", "Melted". Maroufi's books and style were heavily influenced by Iran's modernist writer ; "Houshang Golshiri" who was also his teacher. Marouf lived in Germany where he opened a book-store, He also held writing classes and taught students who show interest in writing and story-telling.

Maroufi died in Berlin on 1 September 2022, at the age of 65.

References

External links
 His poetic weblog
 His political weblog on [Radio Zamaneh]

1957 births
2022 deaths
Iranian male novelists
Iranian novelists
Iranian male short story writers
Iranian journalists
Iranian emigrants to Germany
People from Tehran
University of Tehran alumni